Music for a Blue Train is a 48-minute 2003 documentary about busker musicians in the Montreal Metro subway train system. It was written and directed by Mila Aung-Thwin of EyeSteelFilm and produced by Germaine Ying Gee Wong for the National Film Board of Canada.

A harmonica player known as Bad News Brown (real name Paul Frappier) acts as an impromptu host in the documentary bringing the viewers snippets of the lives of musicians in Montreal's subway system – The Metro – run by Société de transport de Montréal (STM) that gives around 60 spots on a first-come, first-served basis, provided the musician-busker registers his name early enough as soon as the Metro opens to the public and returns during his assigned time to perform for an hour or two, amidst indifference from most passersby or, at times, a token word of encouragement.

External links
EyeSteelFilm page about Music for a Blue Train
NFB collections page for Music for a Blue Train
Excerpt of Music for a Blue Train at NFB.ca (Requires Adobe Flash)

2003 films
English-language Canadian films
Canadian documentary films
EyeSteelFilm films
National Film Board of Canada documentaries
Montreal Metro
Documentary films about Montreal
Street performance
Documentary films about music and musicians
Rail transport films
2003 documentary films
2000s Canadian films